Eduard von Steinle (2 July 1810  – 19 September 1886) was a painter and printmaker. They were born in 1810 in Vienna, Austria and died in 1886 in Frankfurt, Germany. He spent 1828-33 in Rome with similar artists from the Nazarene school before returning to Vienna in 1833. Frederick Leighton studied under him.

Steinlestrasse in Frankfurt-am-Main is named after him.

References

External links
 
 Eduard von Steinle; The Met

1810 births
1886 deaths
Austrian romantic painters
Nazarene painters
19th-century Austrian painters
19th-century German male artists
Romantic painters